The A4063 links the town of Bridgend with Cymer in Wales.

Settlements on route
Settlements served by the route include:
Bridgend
Wild Mill
Pen-y-fai
Sarn
Aberkenfig
Tondu
Coytrahen
Llangynwyd
Cwmfelin
Maesteg
Nantyffyllon
Dyffryn
Caerau
Croeserw
Cymer

Geohash Coordinates: gcjmmqdnqp2

References

Sources
Google Maps UK

Transport in Bridgend County Borough
Transport in Neath Port Talbot
Roads in Wales